Star or The Star is the name of various newspapers:

Africa 
 The Star (Kenya), an English-language daily newspaper published in Nairobi
 The Star (South Africa), based in Gauteng

Asia
Star (Ceylon), a defunct Ceylonese newspaper
The Philippine Star, a Manila-based Philippine newspaper 
The Star (Hong Kong)
The Star (Amman newspaper), an English-language newspaper published in Amman, Jordan
The Star (Malaysia)
The Star (Pakistan), a Pakistani evening newspaper
Star (Turkish newspaper)

Europe 
 The Star (1788), a London evening newspaper founded in 1788, now defunct
 The Star (1888), a London evening newspaper founded in 1888, merged with another newspaper in 1960
 Sheffield Star, an English local newspaper

North America

Canada 
 Toronto Star
 Sudbury Star
 Windsor Star
 Montreal Star, 1869-1979

United States
 Star, a glossy celebrity magazine, originally a supermarket tabloid newspaper
 The Star (Chicago newspaper), a Chicago, Illinois, newspaper group
 The Star (Florida), a weekly newspaper published in Port St. Joe, Florida, U.S.
 The Star, an African American paper in Newport News, Virginia
 The Star (Tinley Park), Chicago
 The Star (Auburn), a daily newspaper in Auburn, Indiana
 The Indianapolis Star, Indianapolis, Indiana
 The Kansas City Star, Kansas City, Missouri
 The Meridian Star, Meridian, Mississippi
 Omaha Star, a historic African American newspaper in North Omaha, Nebraska
 Seattle Star, a daily newspaper in Seattle, Washington (1899–1947)
 Seattle Star (2002–2005), a free, neighborhood newspaper in Seattle, Washington
 Washington Star, published in Washington, D.C. between 1852 and 1981

Oceania 
 Auckland Star, a New Zealand daily published from 1870 to 1991
 The Star (Christchurch), a New Zealand daily published from 1868 to 1991
 The Star (Ballarat), an Australian newspaper published from 1855 to 1924
 The Star (Sydney), an Australian newspaper published from 1887 to 1909, then as The Sun until 1988

See also
 Star (disambiguation)
 Daily Star (disambiguation)
 Evening Star (disambiguation)
 Morning Star (disambiguation)
 The North Star (anti-slavery newspaper), published from 1847–1851 by the abolitionist Frederick Douglass
 Northern Star (disambiguation)
 Star News (disambiguation)''

Lists of newspapers